|}

This is a list of House of Assembly results for the 1989 South Australian state election.

Results by electoral district

Adelaide

Albert Park

Alexandra

Baudin

Bragg

Briggs

Bright

Chaffey

Coles

Custance

Davenport

Elizabeth

Eyre

Fisher

Flinders

Florey

Gilles

Goyder

Hanson

Hartley

Hayward

Henley Beach

Heysen

Kavel

Light

Mawson

Mitcham

Mitchell

Morphett

Mount Gambier

Murray-Mallee

Napier

Newland

Norwood

Peake

Playford

Price

Ramsay

Ross Smith

Semaphore

Spence

Stuart

Todd

Unley

Victoria

Walsh

Whyalla

See also
 Candidates of the 1989 South Australian state election
 Members of the South Australian House of Assembly, 1989–1993

References

1989
1989 elections in Australia
1980s in South Australia